The 1995 Tennessee Volunteers football team represented the University of Tennessee in the 1995 NCAA Division I-A football season.  Sophomore Peyton Manning was a member of the team. Phillip Fulmer was the head coach.

Schedule

Roster

Team players drafted into the NFL

Peyton Manning was the first pick overall in the 1998 NFL Draft.
Peerless Price was selected in the 1999 NFL Draft.

References

Tennessee
Tennessee Volunteers football seasons
Citrus Bowl champion seasons
Tennessee Volunteers football